The Curtis Museum in Alton, is a local history museum in Hampshire, England.

The museum was founded in 1865 by Dr William Curtis (1803–1881).

In 2014, ownership of the museum was transferred to the Hampshire Cultural Trust as part of a larger transfer of museums from Hampshire County Council and Winchester City Council.

Displays
It contains a wide range of artefacts and displays including:
Prehistoric tools	
Roman bowls and other material, including a cup found at Selborne	
The Anglo-Saxon Alton buckle	
Artefacts from the Battle of Alton (1643), a battle in the English Civil War 
The "Jane Austen Trail"
The tale of Sweet Fanny Adams, who was murdered locally in 1867
Hop picking and brewing

Closure threat
In 2010, both the Curtis Museum and the Allen Gallery were under threat of closure, following their receipt of an email to that effect from the Museum & Arts Service. The Museum and Gallery were taken over by the Hampshire Museums and Galleries Trust, which ran both buildings with the help of volunteers, on behalf of Hampshire County Council. As of May 2014, management was transferred back to Hampshire County Council.

References

External links
 Curtis Museum
 Allen Gallery

1865 establishments in England
Museums in Hampshire
Biographical museums in Hampshire
Local museums in Hampshire
Museums established in 1865
Alton, Hampshire